The National Board of Review Award for Best Film is one of the annual awards given (since 1932) by the National Board of Review of Motion Pictures.

Winners
 † = Winner of the Academy Award for Best Picture
 ‡ = Nominated for the Academy Award for Best Picture
 § = Not nominated for the Academy Award for Best Picture

1930s

1940s

1950s

1960s

1970s

1980s

1990s

2000s

2010s

2020s

Multiple winners (3 or more)
Steven Spielberg-4
John Ford-3
David Lean-3 (one as co-director)

References

National Board of Review Awards
Lists of films by award
Awards for best film
Awards established in 1932
1932 establishments in the United States